Petryata is a rural locality (a village) in Andreyevskoye Rural Settlement, Kishertsky District, Perm Krai, Russia. The population was 44 as of 2010.

Geography 
Petryata is located 25 km northeast of Ust-Kishert (the district's administrative centre) by road. Iyata is the nearest rural locality.

References 

Rural localities in Kishertsky District